Kendrick Shackleford (born February 20, 1985) is a former American football offensive tackle. He was drafted by the St. Louis Rams in the sixth round of the 2007 NFL Draft, but released prior to the start of the season. He played college football at Georgia.

Pre-draft

References

External links
Kansas City Chiefs bio

1985 births
Living people
People from Villa Rica, Georgia
Sportspeople from the Atlanta metropolitan area
Players of American football from Georgia (U.S. state)
American football offensive tackles
Georgia Bulldogs football players
St. Louis Rams players
Kansas City Chiefs players
Odessa Roughnecks players
Cleveland Gladiators players
Orlando Predators players